Sir Charles Dalrymple, 1st Baronet,  (15 October 1839 – 20 June 1916) was a Scottish Conservative politician.

Life

Born Charles Fergusson, he was the second surviving son of Sir Charles Dalrymple Fergusson, 5th Baronet, and grandson of Sir James Fergusson, 4th Baronet, and his wife Jean, daughter of David Dalrymple, Lord Hailes. Sir James Fergusson, 6th Baronet, was his elder brother. On the death of his father in 1849 he assumed the surname of Dalrymple in lieu of Fergusson. He was educated at Harrow School and Trinity College, Cambridge, graduating with third-class honours in classics. He was called to the bar at Lincoln's Inn in 1865.
In 1849 he assumed the surname Dalrymple in lieu of his patronymic in accordance with the will of his great-grandfather David Dalrymple, Lord Hailes

He was a Justice of the Peace and Deputy Lieutenant for East Lothian, and a JP for Midlothian and Ayrshire, and a captain in the Prince Regent's Ayr and Wigtown Militia. His seat was at Newhailes, Musselburgh.

He entered Parliament for Buteshire in 1868, a seat he held, with a brief interruption from April to July 60, until 1885, and later represented Ipswich from 1886 to 1906. He was created a baronet, of New Hailes in the County of Midlothian, in 1887, and sworn of the Privy Council, in 1905.

From 1894 to 1896 he was Grand Master of the Freemasons in Scotland.

Dalrymple died on 20 June 1916, aged 76. He is buried in Inveresk churchyard. The grave lies in the north-west corner of the first Victorian cemetery extension, west of the main churchyard.

Family

He was married to Alice Mary Hunter Blair (1850–1889) daughter of Sir Edward Hunter Blair, 4th Baronet.
They had three children, Christian Elizabeth Louisa (later Dumaresq) (1875–1932), David Charles Herbert, (1879–1932) and Alice Mary (1884–1959).

Their son, Lt Cmdr David Charles Herbert Dalrymple (1879–1932), inherited the estates when he became 2nd baronet.

References

External links 
 

1839 births
1916 deaths
People educated at Harrow School
Alumni of Trinity College, Cambridge
Baronets in the Baronetage of the United Kingdom
Charles
Deputy Lieutenants of Buteshire
Scottish Freemasons
Scottish justices of the peace
Members of the Privy Council of the United Kingdom
Members of the Parliament of the United Kingdom for Ipswich
Members of the Parliament of the United Kingdom for Scottish constituencies
UK MPs 1868–1874
UK MPs 1874–1880
UK MPs 1880–1885
UK MPs 1885–1886
UK MPs 1886–1892
UK MPs 1892–1895
UK MPs 1895–1900
UK MPs 1900–1906
Younger sons of baronets